Jugin (also Romanized as Jūgīn and Jowgīn; also known as Jūgan and Jowgan) is a village in Kahir Rural District, in the Central District of Konarak County, Sistan and Baluchestan Province, Iran. At the 2006 census, its population was 29, in 6 families.

References 

Populated places in Konarak County